Nowruzlu (also Romanized as Nowrūzlū) is a village in Baruq Rural District, Baruq District, Miandoab County, West Azerbaijan Province, Iran. At the 2006 census, its population was 678, in 136 families.

References 

Populated places in Miandoab County